Wu Xinghan (born Liu Peng on 24 February 1991) is a Chinese footballer who currently plays for Shandong Taishan as a right-footed left winger in the Chinese Super League.

Club career
Wu Xinghan started his football career when he joined Shandong Luneng's youth academy in 2005. He played for third-tier side Shandong Youth in 2011, scoring eight goals in 13 appearances that season. With his first goal for the club scored on 21 May 2011 in a 2-0 win against Hebei Zhongji. Wu was promoted to Shandong Luneng's first team (now renamed Shandong Taishan) by then manager Henk ten Cate in the 2012 season. He made his debut for the club on 24 March 2012 in a 3-3 draw against Dalian Aerbin, coming on as a substitute for Liu Binbin.

Wu would cement his place as a regular in the team's midfield during the 2012 season and even after the departure of Henk ten Cate, he continued to be a regular squad player that would aid the club by winning the 2014 Chinese FA Cup with them. A consistent regular within the team, he would gain his second Chinese FA Cup by winning the 2020 Chinese FA Cup against Jiangsu Suning F.C. in a 2-0 victory. This would be followed by his first league title with the club when he was part of the team that won the 2021 Chinese Super League title. Another Chinese FA Cup would be followed up by him winning the 2022 Chinese FA Cup with them.

International career
Wu was first called up to the Chinese under-20 national team by Su Maozhen in December 2010. He scored four goals in three appearances during 2012 AFC U-19 Championship qualification as the team qualified for the 2012 AFC U-19 Championship.

He made his debut for China national football team on 30 May 2021 in a World Cup qualifier against Guam.

Career statistics
.

International statistics

International goals
Scores and results list China's goal tally first.

Honours

Club
Shandong Luneng/ Shandong Taishan
Chinese Super League: 2021.
Chinese FA Cup: 2014, 2020, 2021, 2022.
Chinese FA Super Cup: 2015.

References

External links
 

1993 births
Living people
Association football midfielders
Chinese footballers
China international footballers
Footballers from Tianjin
Shandong Taishan F.C. players
China League Two players
Chinese Super League players